The Hamilton Tiger-Cats are a professional Canadian football team based in Hamilton, Ontario, and are members of the East Division in the Canadian Football League (CFL).

The Tiger-Cats were founded in 1950, with the merger of the Hamilton Tigers and the Hamilton Wildcats. Since the merger, the team has appeared in 21 Grey Cup finals and has won eight championships. The current Tiger-Cats head coach is Orlondo Steinauer.

Key

Head coaches
Note: Statistics are current through the end of the 2022 CFL season.

Notes
 A running total of the number of coaches of the Tiger-Cats. Thus, any coach who has two or more separate terms as head coach is only counted once.
 Each year is linked to an article about that particular CFL season.

References

Lists of Canadian Football League head coaches by team

Hamilton Tiger-Cats lists